Ali al-Khawas was a prominent 9th-century Muslim Sufi poet and mystic.

Influence
In 2015 he was cited by the Roman Catholic Pope Francis in his encyclical Laudato si' on the topic of ecology.

Francis writes that humanity can "discover God in all things." In a footnote to that quote, he credits al-Khawas for the concept of nature's "mystical meaning", noting how the poet stressed "the need not to put too much distance between the creatures of the world and the interior experience of God."

Laudato Si`Footnote 159: "The spiritual writer Ali al-Khawas stresses from his own experience the need not to put too much distance between the creatures of the world and the interior experience of God. As he puts it: 'Prejudice should not have us criticize those who seek ecstasy in music or poetry. There is a subtle mystery in each of the movements and sounds of this world. The initiate will capture what is being said when the wind blows, the trees sway, water flows, flies buzz, doors creak, birds sing, or in the sound of strings or flutes, the sighs of the sick, the groans of the afflicted ...' (Eva de Vitray-Meyerovitch [ed.], Anthologie du soufisme, Paris 1978, 200)."

References

9th-century people from the Abbasid Caliphate
Sufi teachers